KIRT is a radio station at 1580 AM in Mission, Texas. It is owned by Bravo Broadcasting Company and carries a Spanish Christian talk format known as La Radical.

History
KIRT received its license in 1957 and by 1958 was broadcasting entirely in Spanish. Its initial owners, Robert F. Pool Sr. and Jr., sold the station to KIRT, Inc. in 1958; in 1970, KIRT was sold to Rio Broadcasting Company.

In 2001, Bravo Broadcasting Company was transferred from Edward L. Gómez to Iglesia del Pueblo.

References

External links

Hidalgo County, Texas
Radio stations established in 1958
IRT
1958 establishments in Texas